Early parliamentary elections were held in Iraq on 12 September 1954, after the Chamber of Deputies elected in June was dissolved by the King on 3 August. The Constitutional Union Party remained the largest party, winning 94 of the 135 seats, although only 25 seats were actually contested.

Results

References

1954 09
Iraq
1954 in Iraq
September 1954 events in Asia